Thomas Gordon (born 30 January 1997) is a Scotland Club XV professional rugby union player who plays for Glasgow Warriors at the Flanker position.

Rugby Union career

Amateur career

Gordon plays for Currie Chieftains.

Gordon secured a Stage 2 place in the Scottish Rugby Academy in the 2015–16 season.

Professional career

The flanker secured a Scottish Rugby Academy Stage 3 place with Edinburgh for the 2016–17 Scottish Rugby Academy season.

On 9 July 2018 it was announced that Gordon had signed a professional deal with Glasgow Warriors. This was a year long partnership contract which meant that Gordon could still play for Currie when not in use by the Warriors.

Gordon made his first appearance for the Warriors in their 50 -17 demolition of Harlequins at North Inch, Perth on 18 August 2018.

Gordon made his competitive Glasgow Warriors debut in the Pro14 match against Ospreys at Scotstoun Stadium on 25 January 2019. The Warriors won the match 9-3.

International career

New Zealand-born Gordon, 21, qualifies for Scotland through his grandparents and has been capped at Scotland U20s. He has also been capped for Scotland Club XV. Gordon received his first call up to the senior Scotland squad on 15 January 2020 for the 2020 Six Nations Championship.

References 

1997 births
Living people
Rugby union players from Rotorua
Scottish rugby union players
Glasgow Warriors players
Edinburgh Rugby players
Currie RFC players
Scotland Club XV international rugby union players
Rugby union flankers